The 37th Golden Disc Awards is a award ceremony held on January 7, 2023, and broadcast through various television networks and streaming platforms in various countries. The ceremony was hosted by Sung Si-kyung, Lee Da-hee, Nichkhun, and Park So-dam.

Criteria
All songs and albums that are eligible to be nominated must be released between early-November 2021 and mid-November 2022. Songs and albums that were excluded from the nominations in the 36th edition due to overlapping in the counting deadline were included in this edition.

Winners and nominees
Nominees are listed in alphabetical order.

Main Awards

The list of nominees except Digital Daesang (Song of the Year) and Disc Daesang (Album of the Year) were announced on December 7, 2022, through the official website. The nominees for Digital Daesang (Song of the Year) and Disc Daesang (Album of the Year) will be chosen from the winners of Digital Song Daesang and Album Bonsang. The list of nominees for Most Popular Artist Award was announced through TikTok on December 20.

Other awards

Multiple awards
The following artist(s) received three awards:

Performers
The first lineup was announced on December 7, 2022. The second and third lineup were announced on December 14, 2022, and January 5, 2023, respectively.

Broadcast

Notes

References

External links
  

2023 in South Korean music
2023 music awards
Golden Disc Awards ceremonies